Shipbuilder's Creek is a small stream in Penfield and Webster, Monroe County, New York flowing roughly south to north, it is  in length before emptying into Lake Ontario in the Webster hamlet of Forest Lawn.

In 2007, aquatic life and recreational uses were thought to be impaired. A restoration project was begun in 2018 to restore the water quality of the creek. The Vosberg Hollow Nature Trail in Webster "ends in a glade of flowers and ground cover next to Shipbuilders Creek."

References

External links

Google Map of Shipbuilder's Creek

Rivers of New York (state)
Rivers of Monroe County, New York